Sinabad (also Romanized as Sīnābād; also known as Deh Zobeydeh, Zobeydeh, and Zubīdeh) is a village in Sarduiyeh Rural District, Sarduiyeh District, Jiroft County, Kerman Province, Iran. At the 2006 census, its population was 439, in 82 families.

References 

Populated places in Jiroft County